The ZC Mindanao Aguilas is a basketball team playing in the PBA Developmental League. The team primarily focuses on giving exposure to Mindanao-based players who receive less attention than their Metro Manila counterparts.

The team made their debut at the 2016 PBA D-League Aspirant's Cup. and earned their first win against BDO-NU Bulldogs.

The team is managed by Kings Janitorial Services and Cooperative of Zamboanga, and is an affiliated team of GlobalPort Batang Pier in the Philippine Basketball League.

Prior to joining the Aspirant's Cup, the team has been preparing for two months for their PBA D-League stint. They won a local tournament in Zamboanga and participated at the Del League in Marikina. They also arranged tune games against Phoenix Petroleum and BDO. They lost both games.

Coaching Staff & Players

Coaching Staff
Team Owners
 Roderick Andong
 Antonio Chiong
 Junnie Navarro
Team Manager 
 Sergei Bien Orillo  
Team Consultant 
 Louie Medalla
Head Coach 
 Nino Rejhi Natividad
Assistant Coaches:  
 Jade Marvin Padrigao (1st Asst.)   
 Nadz Burung   
 Peter Delegero

Current roster
2016 Aspirants Cup 
 3 Jul-Ashri Ignacio 26, 6′-1″
 24 Gino Jumao-As 23, 6′-2″
 27 Taylor Wetherell 25, 6′-0″
 25 Dexter Garcia 26, 5′-11″
 9 Jaynard Rivera 25, 6′-4″
 19 Jericho de Guzman 26, 6′-11″
 8 Ar-Rouf Julkipli 25, 5′-9″
 23 Ivan Villanueva 20, 6′-2″
 18 Kenneth Acibar 26, 6′-4″
 10 Joseph Nalos 23, 5′-8″
 14 Rolando Navarro Jr. 29, 5′-8″
 6  Mark Sarangay 29, 6′-5″
 13 JR Ongteco 26, 6′-5″
 88 Grevanni Rublico 25, 5′-11″

Former players
 # Mark Barroca
 # RR Garcia

References

PBA Developmental League teams